Belgooly GAA is a Gaelic Athletic Association  club based in Belgooly in south Cork, Ireland. It was formed, in its current guise, in 1972. The club fields both hurling and Gaelic football teams in competitions organised by Carrigdhoun GAA (also known as South East Cork). At underage level, the club combines with neighbouring Ballymartle GAA to form Sliabh Rua.

Honours
The club's achievements include:
 Carrigdhoun Junior A Football Championship (1): 2013
 Cork Junior B Football Championship (1): 2011
 Cork Junior B Hurling Championship (1): 2021
 Cork Junior B Inter-Divisional Hurling Championship (1): 2021

References

Gaelic games clubs in County Cork
Gaelic football clubs in County Cork
Hurling clubs in County Cork